The King and I is a South Korean historical series that aired on SBS from August 27, 2007 to April 1, 2008 on Mondays and Tuesdays at 21:55. Starring Oh Man-seok, Koo Hye-sun, and Go Joo-won, the series was moderately successful, with its ratings peak at 25%.

Plot
The King and I revolves around the life of Kim Cheo-sun, considered the best eunuch attendant who lived during the Joseon Dynasty.

Cheo-sun secretly loves his childhood friend So-hwa, but he cannot confess his love because of their difference in social class. Eventually, when So-hwa becomes betrothed to King Seongjong, he castrates himself and enters the palace as an eunuch, determined to watch over and protect her.

Initially the King's concubine, So-hwa is later elevated to the rank of Queen. But she becomes a pawn of the intense strife among warring political factions, and is stripped of her title and cast out of the palace in disgrace. Despite Cheo-sun's attempts to help her, she is sentenced to death. Cheo-sun carries out his orders by handing her the bowl of poison and he watches as the woman he loved all his life dies before his eyes. After her death, he looks after her son, Prince Yeonsan.

Cast

Main characters
Oh Man-seok as Kim Cheo-sun
Joo Min-soo as young Cheo-sun
Koo Hye-sun as Yoon So-hwa, later Deposed Queen Yun 
Park Bo-young as young So-hwa
Go Joo-won as King Seongjong
Yoo Seung-ho as young Prince Jalsan (later Seongjong)
Jun Kwang-ryul as Jo Chi-gyeom, head of the eunuchs
Yang Mi-kyung as Grand Queen Dowager Jaseong (later known as Queen Jeonghui), Seongjong's grandmother
Jeon In-hwa as Queen Dowager Insu, Seongjong's mother
Ahn Jae-mo as Jung Han-soo, a eunuch
Baek Seung-do as young Han-soo
Jeon Hye-bin as Seol-young, Chi-gyeom's adoptive sister
Lee Jin as Queen Yun (later known as Queen Jeonghyeon)

Supporting characters
Shin Goo as Noh Nae-shi, Chi-gyeom's adoptive father / former eunuch
Kim Soo-mi as old woman So-gwi, in charge of discipline at the eunuch training house
Yoon Yoo-sun as Wol-hwa, Cheo-sun's foster mother / Soginopa's daughter)
Kang Nam-gil as Choi Cham-bong, eunuch trainer
Jung Tae-woo as Yi Yung, Prince Yeonsan, King Seongjong and So-hwa's son
Jung Yoon-seok as young Yi Yung
Kim Sa-rang as Eoudong

Extended cast
Yang Jung-a as Lady Oh, Cheo-sun's mother
Lee Il-jae as Kim Ja-myung, Cheo-sun's father
Sunwoo Jae-duk as Yoon Ki-kyun, So-hwa's father
Choi Jung-won as Lady Shin, Ki-kyun's wife
Han Da-min as Queen Gonghye
Kim Hee-jung as young Lady Han
Han So-jung as Court Lady Um
Yoon Hye-kyung as Royal Consort Eom Gwi-in
Ahn Gil-kang as Kae Do-chi
Kim Jung-min as Beo Deul-yi
Jo Jung-eun as young Deul-yi
Kim Da-hyun as Choi Ja-chi
Yoo Tae-woong as young Ja-chi
Kang In-hyung as Moon So-woon
Jeon Ha-eun as young So-woon
Kim Ha-kyun as Jang Soon-moo
Kim Myung-soo as Yang Sung-yoon
Han Jung-soo as Do Geum-pyo
Kim So-hyun as Lady Jung, Ji-gyeom's wife
Kim Byung-se as King Sejo
Yoo Dong-hyuk as King Yejong
Kim Jong-gyul as Han Myung-hoe
Kim Young-joon as Hong Gwi-nam
Shin Tae-hoon as young Gwi-nam
Kang Jae as Kim Ja-won
Choi Soo-han as young Ja-won
Lee Gun-joo as Song Gye-nam
Maeung Chang-min as young Gye-nam
Lee Sang-won as Shim Ki-soo
Park Ha-sun as Queen Shin, Yeonsan's wife
Kim Hyuk as Park Deok-hu, So-hwa's first love
Jung Eun-chan as Yoon Ki-hyun, So-hwa's older brother
Ho Hyo-hoon as young Ki-hyun
Lee Young-eun as palace maid
Kim Yong-heon as Eom Nae-kwan
Kim Byung-choon as Yang Sung-yeon
Park Dong-bin as Goo Sung-gun
Choi Ha-na as Hong Bi
Lee Ji-oh as the Crown Prince, Yeonsan's son
Jun Hyun-ah as Court Lady Kam-chul
Oh Soo-min as Jang Nok-su
Nam Hyun-joo as Han-soo's mother
Jung Ki-sung as Jogeobi
Song Young-gyu as Lee Ki
Shin Soo-jung as Hoo Koong
Seol Ji-yoon as Court Lady Kim
Jung So-young
Kang Soo-han
Noh Young-hak as Grand Prince Jinseong
Jun Tae-soo as Han Chi-geun
Park Ji-hoon as eunuch

Production
Park Sang-min was originally cast as King Seongjong, but had to back out. He was replaced by Go Joo-won.

Yeo Woon-kye was supposed to portray So-gwi but had to quit due to health reasons, even though she had already filmed a few episodes. Her replacement was Kim Soo-mi.

Reportedly enraged because the scripts were routinely turned in late, resulting in exhaustion for the actors in the cast, Jeon In-hwa's husband Yoo Dong-geun assaulted two producers on set on December 29, 2007. He later apologized for the incident.

Episode ratings
The King and I performed moderately well, getting ratings in the 20%–25% range and ranking in the top 10. However, in late January 2008, due to competition from MBC's Yi San, ratings fell to the mid-tens, barely cracking the Top 20 in Korea.

SBS first extended the episodes from the originally planned 50 to 67, then back to 61 because of bad ratings, and finally to 63.

Ratings

Awards
2007 SBS Drama Awards 
Top Excellence Award, Actor Jun Kwang-ryul
Excellence Award, Actor in a Serial Drama: Oh Man-seok
Top 10 Stars: Jun Kwang-ryul
Best Teen Actor: Yoo Seung-ho
Best Teen Actor: Joo Min-soo
Best Teen Actress: Park Bo-young
Achievement Award: Shin Goo
New Star Award: Koo Hye-sun

References

External links
The King and I official SBS website  

Seoul Broadcasting System television dramas
2007 South Korean television series debuts
2008 South Korean television series endings
Korean-language television shows
Television series set in the Joseon dynasty
South Korean historical television series